John is a surname which, like the given name John, is derived from the Hebrew name , , meaning "Graced by Yahweh".

People with this surname include:

 Anaparambil Joseph John (1893–1957), Travancorean freedom fighter and statesman, Chief Minister of Travancore-Cochin and Governor of Madras
 Augustus John (1878–1961), Welsh artist
 Avery John (born 1975), Trinidadian footballer
 Barry John (born 1945), Welsh former rugby union player
 Barry John (artist) MBE, Welsh artist
 Caroline John (1940–2012), British actress
 Collins John (born 1985), Liberia-born Dutch footballer
 Dilwyn John (born 1944), former Welsh footballer
 Edward Thomas John (1857-1931), British politician
 Elton John (born 1947), birth name Reginald Dwight, British pop singer
 Elton John (footballer) (born 1987), Trinidadian footballer
 Fritz John (1910–1994), German-American mathematician
 Gottfried John (1942–2015), German actor
 Gus John (born 1945), Grenadian-born writer, consultant, lecturer and researcher
 Gwen John (1876–1939), Welsh artist, sister of Augustus John
 Isaac John (born 1988), New Zealand Rugby League player
 Jetta John-Hartley, English singer-songwriter and record producer
 Jory John, American children's book author
 Mable John (1930–2022), American blues singer
 Olivia Newton-John (1948–2022), British-Australian singer
 Otto John (1909–1997), German who plotted against Hitler, convicted of treason during the Cold War
 Radek John (born 1954), Czech politician
 Rosamund John (1913–1998), English actress
 Roy John (footballer) (1911–1973), Wales international footballer
 Roy John (rugby union) (1925–1981), Welsh rugby union player
 Rysen John (born 1997), American football player
 Stern John (born 1976), Trinidadian footballer
 Tommy John (born 1943), American baseball player
 Walter John (1879–1940), German chess player
 Little Willie John (1937–1968), American R&B singer

See also 
 Peter John (disambiguation)
 John (disambiguation)
 Johns (surname)
 Alternate forms for the name John

References 

English-language surnames